Grattan Street is a major street in Melbourne, Australia.

Location
It runs from Flemington Road on the Western side to Rathdowne Street on the Eastern Side. It is bisected by Elizabeth Street/Royal Parade, Berkeley Street (South), Barry Street (South), Leicester Street (South), Malvina Place (South), Bouverie Street (South), Swanston Street, Cardigan Street, Lygon Street, Watt Lane (South), Drummond Street and Erskine Lane.

History and landmarks
The street runs through the campus of the University of Melbourne. Other landmarks include the Melbourne Teachers' College, Borsari's Corner, Graduate House, Melbourne University Regiment and the Royal Melbourne Hospital.

References

Streets in Melbourne
Transport in the City of Melbourne (LGA)